Lisa Oldenhof (born 26 March 1980 in Perth, Western Australia) is an Australian sprint canoeist who has competed since the mid-2000s. Competing in two Summer Olympics, she won a bronze medal in the K-4 500 m event at Beijing in 2008.

References

 Australian Olympic Committee profile
Sports-reference.com profile

1980 births
Australian female canoeists
Canoeists at the 2004 Summer Olympics
Canoeists at the 2008 Summer Olympics
Living people
Olympic canoeists of Australia
Olympic bronze medalists for Australia
Olympic medalists in canoeing
Sportswomen from Western Australia
Medalists at the 2008 Summer Olympics
Sportspeople from Perth, Western Australia
21st-century Australian women